Luis Aguiar (born 1 December 1939) is a Uruguayan rower. He competed in the men's coxed pair event at the 1960 Summer Olympics.

References

1939 births
Living people
Uruguayan male rowers
Olympic rowers of Uruguay
Rowers at the 1960 Summer Olympics
People from Carmelo, Uruguay
Pan American Games medalists in rowing
Pan American Games gold medalists for Uruguay
Rowers at the 1959 Pan American Games
20th-century Uruguayan people